The 2011 Philadelphia mayoral election was held on November 8, 2011, to elect the mayor of Philadelphia, Pennsylvania. Incumbent Michael Nutter had been Mayor of Philadelphia since 2008 after being elected in the 2007 election, and was re-elected with approximately 75% of the vote. Primary elections were held on May 17, 2011.

Primary elections
On December 22, 2010, Democratic Mayor Michael Nutter officially announced that he would seek re-election. With the backing of health unions  and the Black Clergy, Nutter was favored by a wide margin to win re-election. His only challenger in the primaries was Milton Street, brother of former Mayor John F. Street, who announced his bid on February 17, 2011. Having spent time in federal prison for a non-felony offense - failure to taxes, he described his plans to work toward finding jobs for convicts after their release. John Street told ''The Philadelphia Inquirer that
Nutter was "not a black mayor ... just a mayor with dark skin." Nutter said those comments were ignorant and said "I don't think anyone ever asked Ed Rendell was he white enough." Nutter had been criticized for "stop and frisk" policies and service cuts.

The Republican primary election saw two candidate vying for office. Real estate agent John Featherman filed in June 2010 to become eligible for the election so that he could fight against increasing taxes and to create a more "business-friendly climate" in the city. In March 2011, former Democrat Karen Brown announced her bid to run as a Republican in the upcoming mayoral election. Though she had numerous ties to the city Democratic party, she won the backing of the city Republican party at an event in late March.

Primary elections were held on May 17, 2011.

General election

Polling
The general election was held on November 8, 2011. With all but one precinct reporting, Nutter received 74.69% of the vote.

Nutter's approval rating in February 2011 was 50%, and in March 2011 was 52%.

A hypothetical matchup poll conducted by the Garin-Hart-Yang Research Group between Nutter and Brown showed Nutter leading with 74%.

Results

References

External links

The Committee of 70 Elections Page

2011 in Philadelphia
2011 Pennsylvania elections
Philadelphia
2011
November 2011 events in the United States